Emmerich is both a surname and a given name. Notable people with the name include:

Given name
 Emmerich Joseph von Breidbach zu Bürresheim (1707–1774), German bishop
 Emmerich Danzer (born 1944), Austrian figure skater
 Emmerich Kálmán (1882-1953), Hungarian composer
 Emmerich Rath (1883-1962), Czech track and field athlete
 Emmerich Teuber (1877-1943), Austrian scouting leader
 Emmerich de Vattel (1714–1767), Swiss philosopher, diplomat, and legal expert

Surname
 André Emmerich (1924-2007), German-American gallerist
 Andreas Emmerich (1739-1809), German soldier and military theorist, author of The Partisan in War
 Anne Catherine Emmerich (1774-1824), German Roman Catholic Augustinian nun, stigmatic, mystic, visionary and ecstatic
 Bob Emmerich (1891–1948), American baseball player
 Christian Emmerich, or Blixa Bargeld (born 1959), German composer, author, actor, singer, musician, performer and lecturer 
 Jörg Emmerich (born 1974), German footballer
 Klaus Emmerich (director) (born 1943), German film director and screenwriter
 Klaus Emmerich (journalist) (1928-2021), Austrian journalist
 Lothar Emmerich (1941-2003), German footballer
 Max Emmerich (1879–1956), American track and field athlete and gymnast 
 Noah Emmerich (born 1965), American film actor 
 Peter Emmerich (born 1973), American illustrator
 Roland Emmerich (born 1955), German film director, screenwriter, and producer
 Slim Emmerich (1919–1998), American baseball player
 Toby Emmerich (born 1963), American producer, film executive, and screenwriter

Fictional characters
 Alonzo D. Emmerich, from the film The Asphalt Jungle
The Emmerich family, from the video game series Metal Gear
Surnames from given names

See also
 Amerigo (disambiguation)
 Emmrich

German masculine given names
German-language surnames